Viviana Campanile Zagorianakou (born 1990) is a Greek beauty pageant contestant.  At the age of 19, she won the title of Miss Star Hellas (Miss Greece) and went on to compete in Miss Universe, but failed to place.

References 

Living people
1990 births
Miss Universe 2009 contestants
Greek beauty pageant winners
Greek people of Italian descent